Manu Brabo (1981) is a Spanish photojournalist who was captured in Libya along with three other journalists while covering the Libyan Civil War in 2011 and who was part of the Associated Press team to win the Pulitzer Prize for Breaking News Photography in 2013.

Personal
Brabo was born in Zaragoza, Spain in 1981 and lived in Gijón, Spain. He studied photography at the School of Arts and Crafts in Oviedo and journalism at Charles III University in Madrid.

Career
After completing his education, Brabo worked at some Spanish newspapers and news agencies. He covered the Libyan Civil War in 2011, the Syrian Civil War, the Ukrainian conflict and the war in Iraq as other conflicts. He has worked as a freelance photojournalist for the Associated Press (AP) and the European Pressphoto Agency, and his work has been published in newspapers and magazines. He is co-founder with Spanish photographers Guillem Valle, José Colón and Diego Ibarra as well as the Italian Fabio Bucciarelli, of MEMO, a cooperative of photojournalists created in 2014 in Torino, Italy.

Disappearance

On 5 April 2011, Brabo along with journalists James Foley, Clare Morgana Gillis and Anton Hammerl were reportedly detained by pro-Gadaffi soldiers in the Libyan Desert near Brega. As they were traveling with an unorganized militia they witnessed a military truck approaching them. It was then that one of the journalists, later identified as Hammerl, was shot from the military truck. Brabo was one of the 16 journalists detained in Tripoli. While being held in Tripoli, they received a visit from a Spanish diplomat who reported that Brabo along with others were being held humanely and were treated well. He and the other journalists were found guilty in a Libyan court for entering without a proper visa and their sentences suspended. Brabo and the others were released on 18 May 2011.

Pulitzer Prize (2013)

Brabo took a photograph on 3 October 2012 during the aftermath of a car bombing in Aleppo, Syria. This photograph was part of a series of Associated Press breaking news photographs awarded the Pulitzer Prize for Breaking News Photography in 2013.

Brabo shared the prize with AP photographers Rodrigo Abd, Narciso Contreras, Khalil Hamra and Muhammed Muheisen.

Awards
 2006:  (Translated: Young Authors Award) for "Caminos de hierro"
 2009: Premio Nómadas Periscopio (Translated: Nomads Periscope Award) at the Festival of Photojournalism in Vitoria 
 2011: The Atlanta Photojournalism Seminar: Chris Hondros Memorial International News Award, 1st place, General News
 2012: Alliance of Mediterranean News Agencies Awards, Best Photo 2011-2012
 2012: The Atlanta Photojournalism Seminar: Chris Hondros Memorial International News Award, 1st place, General News
 2012: National Headliner Awards, 1st place & Best In Show
 2012: Prix Bayeux-Calvados for War Correspondents, Audience Award
 2013: China International Press Photo, Silver prize, War and Disaster News Stories
 2013: Overseas Press Club of America, Honorable Mention, Robert Capa Gold Medal
 2013: Pulitzer Prize for Breaking News Photography
 2013: Pictures of the Year International, 1st place, Spot News
 2014: Giornalisti del Mediterraneo, Italy
 2015: British Journalism Awards, Photojournalism
 2016: Pictures of the Year International, 2nd, News Picture Story
 2016: Press Awards, UK. "Photographer of the year 2015"

References 

1981 births
Spanish journalists
Spanish photographers
Living people